Carbacanthographis aggregata is a species of corticolous (bark-dwelling) lichen in the family Graphidaceae. Found in Asia, it was formally described as a new species in 2022 by Shirley Cunha Feuerstein and Robert Lücking. It has also been recorded from the Tai Po Kau Nature Reserve in China. The lichen has a greenish grey to grey thallus that lacks a cortex, but has a black prothallus. Its ascomata (ascospore-bearing structures) are aggregated in small clusters; it is this characteristic that is referred to in the specific epithet aggregata. The lichen contains salazinic acid and trace amounts of norstictic acid; these are lichen products that can be detected using thin-layer chromatography.

References

aggregata
Lichen species
Lichens described in 2022
Taxa named by Robert Lücking
Lichens of China
Lichens of Malaysia